The 1992–93 Croatian First Football League was the second season of the top football league in Croatia since its establishment after Croatia gained independence from Yugoslavia. Games were played from 23 August 1992 to 12 June 1993.

HAŠK Građanski (renamed Croatia Zagreb in mid-season), present-day Dinamo Zagreb, won their first Prva HNL championship title. Goran Vlaović of HAŠK was the league's top goalscorer with 22 goals scored. At the end of the season no teams were relegated since it was decided that the league would expand to 18 clubs for the 1993–94 season.

Clubs

League table
Croatia was admitted to the UEFA at the end of the season. It obtained a place in the preliminary rounds of the two major European competitions, while it was too late for the third one.

Results

Season statistics
Most goals in a match: 10 goals – Croatia Zagreb 8–2 Radnik Velika Gorica (1 November 1992).
Widest winning margin: 7 goals – Croatia Zagreb 8–1 Belišće (25 April 1993).
First hat-trick of the season: Dinko Livada for Radnik Velika Gorica against Osijek (27 September 1992).
Most goals scored by one player in a match: 4 goals – Goran Vlaović for Croatia Zagreb against Belišće (25 April 1993).

Top goalscorers

European competitions
Croatian clubs were not eligible to compete in European competitions this season, as the Croatian Football Federation did not join UEFA until June 16, 1993.

See also
1992–93 Croatian Football Cup

References

External links
League table and results at Prva HNL official website 
1992–93 in Croatian football at Rec.Sport.Soccer Statistics Foundation

Croatian Football League seasons
Cro
Prva Hnl 1992-93